Chada Thaiseth (born 7 June 1963) is a Thai politician who had been a member of the Parliament from Chartthaipattana.

Thaiseth was born to a Thai family of partial Pakistani ancestry. His younger sister, Mananya Thaiseth, is a Deputy Agriculture Minister of Thailand.

References

Living people
Chada Thaiseth
Chada Thaiseth
1963 births